

Series produced by BNT 

 1971 On each kilometer (На всеки километър)
 1989 Men without a mustache (Мъже без мустаци)
 1990 Fathers and Sons (Бащи и синове)
 1999 Clinic on the third floor (Клиника на третия етаж)
 1999 Danube bridge (Дунав мост)
 2006 Good day mister Jasmin (Добър ден,господин Жасмин)
 2006 Sparrows in October (Врабците през октомври)
 2008 Outcasts (Хъшове)
 2008 Lyudmil and Ruslana (Людмил и Руслана)
 2011 Pod Prikritie (Undercover) (Под прикритие)
 2011 The English Neighbour (Английският съсед)
 2013 Not Given Away (Недадените)
 2013 Fourth Power (Четвърта власт)
 2019 For weightlifters(При щангистите),Director Nicky Stoichkov
 2019 Father's Day (Денят на бащата),Director Pavel Vesnakov
 2019 Blue Birds Island (Островът на сините птици),Director Kristina Grozeva, Petar Valchanov
 2019 Rumbata, I and Ronaldo(Румбата, аз и Роналдо)

Series produced by BTV 

 2002 She and He (Тя и Той)
 2011 Glass Home (Стъклен дом)
 2011 House Arrest (Домашен арест)
 2011 Seven Hours Difference (Седем часа разлика)
 2011 Great Bulgaria (Велика България)
 2011 Sofia Residents in Excess (Столичани в повече)
 2012 Where is Magi? (Къде е Маги)
 2012 Revolution Z (Революция Z)
 2013 The Family (Фамилията)
 2015 Liaisons (Връзки)
 2016 Players (Играчи)
 2018 Dear Heirs (Скъпи Наследници)
 2020 Sunny Beach
 2021 The Scars (Белези)
 2021 Daddies (Татковци)
 2022 Don't think for me (Мен не ме мислете

Series producing by Nova Television 

 2004 Hotel Bulgaria
 2004 Sea Salt (Морска сол)
 2008 Forbidden Love (Забранена любов)
 2011 Condominium (Етажна собственост) 
 2012 Married with children in Bulgaria (Женени с деца в България)
 2012 Payback (Отплата)
 2016 Stolen life (Откраднат живот)
 2017 We, our and your (Ние, нашите и вашите)
 2018 The Policemen from the end of the city (Полицаите от края на града)
 2019 Devil's Throat (Дяволското гърло)
 2019 Mr. X and the sea (Господин X и морето)
 2019 The Road of Honor (Пътят на честта)
 2020 All Inclusive
 2020 Strawberry moon (Ягодова луна)
 2020 Brothers (Братя)
 2021 Wanted Department (Отдел Издирване)
 2022 The lies in us (Лъжите в нас)
 2022 With a river of heart (С река на сърцето
 2023 Very much my man (Много мой човек)

Series producing by TV7 (Bulgaria) 

 2006 Unexpected Turn (Неочакван обрат)
 2012 Mitrani Law Firm (Кантора Митрани)
 2012 Morning Show (Сутрешен блок)
 2013 The Tree of Life (Дървото на живота)
 2013 Sex, Lies & TV: Eight's day week (Секс, лъжи и ТВ: Осем дни в седмицата)
 2013 Shmenti Kapeli: The Legend (Шменти Капели: Легендата)
 2014 The Sign of Bulgarian (Знакът на българина)

Series producing by Fox Life 

 2016 Liaisons (Връзки)

References